Mark Ryan Lye (born November 13, 1952) is an American professional golfer who played on the PGA Tour and the Champions Tour.

Early life 
Lye was born in Vallejo, California. He attended San Jose State University, where he was a three-time All-American on the golf team. He graduated in 1975 and turned pro later that year.

Professional career
Before Lye joined the PGA Tour he played in Australia. He won the Australian Tour's 1976 Colgate Champion of Champions by one stroke over New Zealand's Simon Owen and two over Kel Nagle. Lye did not even expect to stay in Australia after he failed to qualify for that year's Australian Open. A friend encouraged him to remain and play in the Melbourne event. After a 70-71 start, he was three under, six shots behind Nagle. Lye then shot 68-67 to defeat a field that included, in addition to Owen and Nagle, 1975 U.S. Open champion Lou Graham, 1975 Open Championship winner Tom Watson, and recent Australian Tour champion Greg Norman. Lye went on to win the 1976 PGA Tour of Australia Order of Merit.

Lye joined the PGA Tour in 1977. He was a full-time member of tour from 1977 to 1991. In 1980 he finished 39th on the money list, with two runner-up finishes. Three years later, in 1983, he recorded his only victory on the PGA Tour, at the Bank of Boston Classic. Lye was eight shots behind in a tie for 16th when the round started. He did not hold even a share of the lead until the 69th hole of the tournament. He birdied three of the final four holes for a 64 (−7) to win by one shot. Later in the fall, at the last event of the season, he had a runner-up finish at the Pensacola Open. He had six top-10s in total for 1983, his most ever, and finished 28th on the money list, his best ever.

Lye's win qualified him for the 1984 Masters Tournament. He shot first round 69 (−3) and then surged to a three shot lead after a 66. He fell back a little after a third round 73 but was still in second place, one behind Tom Kite. He had a final round of 74, finishing T-6, his best finish in a major championship. Lye had an additional four top-10s in 1984 and finished 43rd on the money list.

In 1995, at the age of 43, Lye tore a ligament in his right hand at the FedEx St. Jude Classic and retired from the tour. He then began working as an analyst for The Golf Channel, eventually rising to lead analyst for men's tournament coverage. After reaching the age of 50 in November 2002, Lye joined the Champions Tour as a part-time player. His best finish on that tour was a solo 9th at the 2004 Greater Hickory Classic at Rock Barn. To compete in select Champions Tour events, Lye transitioned to being an on-course reporter.

In August 2015, Lye was hired as one of the cohosts of "The Scorecard," a pregame show for Saturday and Sunday rounds of every broadcast PGA Tour event, on Sirius XM. He was fired in February 2022 after making negative on-air comments about women's sports.

Personal life 
Lye plays guitar, in particular blues guitar, and has played with a member of Eric Clapton's band. Late in his career he formed Jake Trout and the Flounders, a cover band with fellow professional golfers Payne Stewart and Peter Jacobsen. He also made a cameo in the 1996 golf-comedy film Happy Gilmore that starred Adam Sandler.

Lye is diabetic and has had additional health issues. Lye has battled malignant melanoma. He first discovered a dime-sized mole on his left knee in 1991 and had surgery to remove it. He was cancer free for more than five years; however, in 2002, a small growth on his left thigh was discovered. He had surgery and other aggressive treatments for this recurrence and remains under a doctor's care.

Influenced by his cancer diagnosis he became a born-again Christian.

Lye lives in Naples, Florida. He and his wife Lisa have two children, Lucas and Eva.

Lye was inducted into the California Golf Writers Hall of Fame in February 2007.

Professional wins (2)

PGA Tour wins (1)

PGA Tour of Australasia wins (1)

Results in major championships

WD = withdrew
CUT = missed the half-way cut
"T" indicates a tie for a place

See also 

 Fall 1976 PGA Tour Qualifying School graduates

References

External links

American male golfers
San Jose State Spartans men's golfers
PGA Tour golfers
PGA Tour of Australasia golfers
PGA Tour Champions golfers
Golf writers and broadcasters
Golfers from California
Golfers from Florida
American sports announcers
Sportspeople from Vallejo, California
Sportspeople from Naples, Florida
People with type 1 diabetes
1952 births
Living people